Carl Bennet (born 1951) is a Swedish billionaire businessman. He is the chairman of the medical technology firm Getinge and the printing company Elanders.

Early life
Carl Bennet was born in 1951, and has a bachelor's degree in economics, and an MBA from the University of Gothenburg.

Career
Through Carl Bennet AB, of which he is the sole owner, he has significant holdings in Lifco, Getinge, Elanders and other companies.

As of June 2020, Forbes estimated his net worth at US$4.7 billion.

Personal life
He is married with one child and lives in Gothenburg, Sweden.

References

1951 births
Living people
Swedish billionaires
20th-century Swedish businesspeople
Businesspeople from Gothenburg
University of Gothenburg alumni
Swedish people of Scottish descent
21st-century Swedish businesspeople